Statistics of Kuwaiti Premier League in the 1979–80 season.

Overview
Al Arabi Kuwait won the championship.

References
RSSSF

1979–80
1979–80 in Asian association football leagues
football